'Panische Zeiten', the soundtrack of the film Panic Time (1980), is the twelfth album by German rock musician Udo Lindenberg.

Track listing
All lyrics by Udo Lindenberg.  All music as noted.
 Die Heizer kommen  4:40 (Thomas Kretschmer)
 Katze  3:28 (Lindenberg)
 Auf heißer Spur  3:38 (Lindenberg)
 Raketen-Rocker  4:16 (Lindenberg, Kretschmer)
 Deutsche Nationalhymne  2:26 (Haydn)
 Jamaika  4:21 (Lindenberg, Jean-Jacques Kravetz)
 Leinwand  3:52 (Lindenberg)
 Du warst wie ein Erdbeben  4:18 (Kretschmer)
 Baby, wenn ich down bin  3:25 (Lindenberg)
 Detektiv Coolman  4:17 (Lindenberg)

Musicians
 Udo Lindenberg - Vocals, piano, synthesizer
 Thomas Kretschmer - Guitar
 Hannes Bauer - Guitar
 Bertram Engel - Drums
 Dieter Ahrendt - Drums
 Thomas Digi - Drums
 Dave King - Bass, piano, synthesizer
 Steffi Stephan - Bass
 Jean-Jaques Kravetz - Piano, synthesizer

Additional musicians
 Leata Galloway - Vocals on 9
 Spürnasen-Kinderchor

Udo Lindenberg albums
German-language albums
1980 soundtrack albums